Pierre D'Auteuil (April 2, 1857 – December 11, 1933) was a Canadian lawyer, politician and judge.

Born in Rivière-Ouelle, Canada East, D'Auteuil was educated at the Séminaire de Québec and at the Université Laval. He was called to the Bar of Quebec in 1881 and created a King's Counsel in 1906.

A lawyer, he was mayor of Baie-Saint-Paul, Quebec from 1897 to 1901. He was elected to the Legislative Assembly of Quebec for Charlevoix in 1897. A Conservative, he did not run in 1900. He was elected again in 1904 and 1908, and then again (in Charlevoix-Saguenay) in 1912, and 1916. He was defeated in 1919.

In 1921, he was made a judge of the Quebec Superior Court.

References

1857 births
1933 deaths
Conservative Party of Quebec MNAs
Judges in Quebec
Lawyers in Quebec
People from Bas-Saint-Laurent
Canadian King's Counsel
Université Laval alumni